St. Wilfrid's Church, North Muskham is a parish church in the Church of England in North Muskham, Nottinghamshire.

The church is Grade I listed by the Department for Digital, Culture, Media and Sport as a building of outstanding architectural or historic interest.

History

The church is medieval and was restored in 1906 and 1907.

It is recorded by Dr. Thoroton that a flood which occurred about 1600 the River Trent changed its course, and separated the parish of North Muskham from the hamlet of Holme. At about the same time, Sir Thomas Barton, the descendant of a wealthy merchant, owned a large house and a great amount of property at Holme, and North Muskham Church benefited from his wealth.

The Barton family coat of arms with impalements and rebus (a bear and a tun), is displayed in  various places in the church.

Description
The oldest parts of the church are the lower part of the tower and the north arcade, the piers of which are octagonal and may be the earliest of this type in the county. The piers of the south arcade are Perpendicular and are similar to those of St Mary's, Nottingham. The nave has a clerestory and is covered by a contemporary timber roof. The chancel is impressive and has a five light east window. The pulpit is probably late 17th century and may be contemporary with the altar rails; Nikolaus Pevsner describes the screen as "exceptionally fully cusped".

Parish structure

St. Wilfrid's Church, North Muskham is part of a joint parish which includes the churches of
Church of St. Michael and All Angels, Averham
St. Wilfrid's Church, Kelham
St. Wilfrid's Church, South Muskham

Sources
The Buildings of England, Nottinghamshire. Nikolaus Pevsner

Church of England church buildings in Nottinghamshire
Grade I listed churches in Nottinghamshire